John Reginald Owen (5 August 1887 – 5 November 1972) was a British actor. He was known for his many roles in British and American films and television programs.

Career
The son of Joseph and Frances Owen, Reginald Owen studied at Sir Herbert Tree's Royal Academy of Dramatic Art and made his professional debut in 1905.
In 1911, he starred in the original production of Where the Rainbow Ends as Saint George, which opened to very good reviews on 21 December 1911. A few years earlier, Reginald Owen met the author Mrs. Clifford Mills as a young actor, and it was he who, on hearing her idea of a Rainbow Story, persuaded her to turn it into a play, and thus Where the Rainbow Ends was born. He co-authored the play with Mills using the pseudonym John Ramsey.

He went to the United States in 1920 and worked originally on Broadway in New York City, and later moved to Hollywood, where he began a lengthy film career. He was a familiar face in many Metro-Goldwyn-Mayer productions.

Owen is perhaps best known today for his performance as Ebenezer Scrooge in the 1938 film version of Charles Dickens' A Christmas Carol, a role he inherited from Lionel Barrymore, who had played the part of Scrooge on the radio every Christmas for years until Barrymore broke his hip in an accident.

Owen was one of several actors to play both Sherlock Holmes and his companion Dr. Watson, along with Jeremy Brett, Carleton Hobbs, Patrick Macnee, Howard Marion-Crawford, and Edward Woodward.

Owen first played Watson in the film Sherlock Holmes (1932) starring Clive Brook as Holmes, and then Holmes in A Study in Scarlet (1933). Having played Ebenezer Scrooge, Sherlock Holmes, and Dr. Watson, Owen has the odd distinction of playing three classic characters of Victorian fiction only to live to see those characters be taken over and personified by other actors, namely Alastair Sim as Scrooge, Basil Rathbone as Holmes and Nigel Bruce as Watson.

Later in his career, Owen appeared with James Garner in the television series Maverick in the episodes "The Belcastle Brand" (1957) and "Gun-Shy" (1958) and guest starred in episodes of the series One Step Beyond, Kentucky Jones, and Bewitched. He was featured in the Walt Disney films Mary Poppins (1964) and Bedknobs and Broomsticks (1971). He had a small role in the 1962 Irwin Allen production of the Jules Verne novel Five Weeks in a Balloon. In August 1964, his mansion in Bel Air was rented to the Beatles, who were performing at the Hollywood Bowl, when no hotel would book them.

Death
Owen died from a heart attack at age 85 in Boise, Idaho, and eventually was buried at the Morris Hill Cemetery in Boise.

Filmography

 Henry VIII (1911) as Thomas Cromwell
 Sally in Our Alley (1916) as Harry
 A Place in the Sun (1916) as Stuart Capel
 Possession (1922) as Lord Wheatley
 The Grass Orphan (1922) as Heathcote St. John
 The Letter (1929) as Robert Crosbie
 The Man in Possession (1931) as Claude Dabney
 Platinum Blonde (1931) as Grayson
 Lovers Courageous (1932) as Jimmy
 A Woman Commands (1932) as The Prime Minister
 The Man Called Back (1932) as Dr. Atkins
 Downstairs (1932) as Baron 'Nicky' von Burgen
 Sherlock Holmes (1932) as Dr. Watson
 Robbers' Roost (1932) as Cecil Herrick
 A Study in Scarlet (1933) as Sherlock Holmes
 The Narrow Corner (1933) as Mr. Frith
 Double Harness (1933) as Freeman
 Voltaire (1933) as King Louis XV
 The Big Brain (1933) as Lord Darlington
 Queen Christina (1933) as Charles X Gustav of Sweden
 Nana (1934) as Bordenave
 Mandalay (1934) as Col. Thomas Dawson - Police Commissioner
 Fashions of 1934 (1934) as Oscar Baroque
 The House of Rothschild (1934) as Herries
 The Countess of Monte Cristo (1934) as The Baron
 Where Sinners Meet (1934) as Leonard
 Stingaree (1934) as The Governor-General
 Madame Du Barry (1934) as King Louis XV
 Of Human Bondage (1934) as Athelny
 The Human Side (1934) as James Dalton
 Music in the Air (1934) as Ernst Weber
 Here Is My Heart (1934) as Prince Vladimir / Vova
 The Good Fairy (1935) as Detlaff, the Waiter
 Enchanted April (1935) as Henry Arbuthnot
 Escapade (1935) as Paul
 The Call of the Wild (1935) as Mr. Smith
 Anna Karenina (1935) as Stiva
 The Bishop Misbehaves (1935) as Guy Waller
 A Tale of Two Cities (1935) as Stryver
 Rose Marie (1936) as Myerson
 Petticoat Fever (1936) as Sir James Felton
 The Great Ziegfeld (1936) as Sampston
 Trouble for Two (1936) as President of Club
 Yours for the Asking (1936) as Dictionary McKinney
 The Girl on the Front Page (1936) as Archie Biddle
 Adventure in Manhattan (1936) as Blackton Gregory
 Love on the Run (1936) as Baron Otto Spanderman
 Dangerous Number (1937) as Cousin William
 Personal Property (1937) as Claude Dabney
 Madame X (1937) as Maurice Dourel
 The Bride Wore Red (1937) as Admiral Monti
 Conquest (1937) as Tallyrand
 Rosalie (1937) as Chancellor
 Everybody Sing (1938) as Hillary Bellaire
 Paradise for Three (1938) as Johann Kesselhut
 Kidnapped (1938) as Captain Hoseason
 Three Loves Has Nancy (1938) as William, the Butler
 Vacation from Love (1938) as John Hodge Lawson
 A Christmas Carol (1938) as Ebenezer Scrooge
 The Girl Downstairs (1938) as Charlie Grump
 Fast and Loose (1939) as Vincent Charlton
 Hotel Imperial (1939) as General Videnko
 Bridal Suite (1939) as Sir Horace Bragdon
 The Real Glory (1939) as Capt. Hartley
 Bad Little Angel (1939) as Edwards, Marvin's Valet
 Remember? (1939) as Mr. Bronson
 The Earl of Chicago (1940) as Gervase Gonwell
 The Ghost Comes Home (1940) as Hemingway
 Florian (1940) as Emperor Franz Josef
 Hullabaloo (1940) as 'Buzz' Foster
 Blonde Inspiration (1941) as Reginald
 Free and Easy (1941) as Sir George Kelvin
 A Woman's Face (1941) as Bernard Dalvik
 They Met in Bombay (1941) as General Allen
 Charley's Aunt (1941) as Redcliff
 Lady Be Good (1941) as Max Milton
 A Yank in the R.A.F. (1941) as 'Internal Injury' in Air raid drill (uncredited)
 Tarzan's Secret Treasure (1941) as Professor Elliott
 Woman of the Year (1942) as Clayton
 We Were Dancing (1942) as Major Berty Tyler-Blane
 Mrs. Miniver (1942) as Foley
 I Married an Angel (1942) as 'Whiskers'
 Pierre of the Plains (1942) as Noah Glenkins
 Cairo (1942) as Philo Cobson
 Somewhere I'll Find You (1942) as Willie Manning
 White Cargo (1942) as Skipper of the Congo Queen
 Random Harvest (1942) as 'Biffer'
 Reunion in France (1942) as Schultz
 Forever and a Day (1943) as Simpson
 Assignment in Brittany (1943) as Colonel Trane
 Above Suspicion (1943) as Dr. Mespelbrunn
 Three Hearts for Julia (1943) as John Girard
 Salute to the Marines (1943) as Mr. Henry Caspar
 Madame Curie (1943) as Dr. Becquerel
 The Canterville Ghost (1944) as Lord Canterville
 National Velvet (1944) as Farmer Ede
 The Picture of Dorian Gray (1945) as Lord George Farmour (uncredited)
 The Valley of Decision (1945) as McCready
 Kitty (1945) as Duke of Malmunster
 She Went to the Races (1945) as Dr. Pembroke
 Captain Kidd (1945) as Cary Shadwell
 The Sailor Takes a Wife (1945) as Mr. Amboy
 The Diary of a Chambermaid (1946) as Captain Lanlaire
 Cluny Brown (1946) as Sir Henry Carmel
 Monsieur Beaucaire (1946) as King Louis XV
 Piccadilly Incident (1946) as Judge
 The Imperfect Lady (1947) as Mr. Hopkins
 Thunder in the Valley (1947) as James Moore
 Green Dolphin Street (1947) as Captain O'Hara
 If Winter Comes (1947) as Mr. Fortune
 The Pirate (1948) as The Advocate
 Julia Misbehaves (1948) as Benjamin Hawkins
 The Three Musketeers (1948) as Treville
 Hills of Home (1948) as Hopps
 The Secret Garden (1949) as Ben Weatherstaff
 Challenge to Lassie (1949) as Sergeant Davie
 The Miniver Story (1950) as Mr. Foley
 Kim (1950) as Father Victor
 Grounds for Marriage (1951) as Dely Delacorte
 The Great Diamond Robbery (1954) as Bainbridge Gibbons
 Red Garters (1954) as Judge Wallace Winthrop
 While the City Sleeps (1956) as Steven (Vincent Price's Butler, Uncredited)
 Darby's Rangers (1958) as Sir Arthur Hollister
 Five Weeks in a Balloon (1962) as Consul
 Tammy and the Doctor (1963) as Jason Tripp
 The Thrill of It All (1963) as Old Tom Fraleigh
 Voice of the Hurricane (1964) as Nigel Charter
 Mary Poppins (1964) as Admiral Boom
 Rosie! (1967) as Patrick
 Bedknobs and Broomsticks (1971) as Major General Sir Brian Teagler

References

Further reading

External links

 
 
 

1887 births
1972 deaths
Alumni of RADA
English expatriates in the United States
English male film actors
English male stage actors
English male television actors
Metro-Goldwyn-Mayer contract players
People from Wheathampstead
20th-century English male actors
Male actors from Hertfordshire
British expatriate male actors in the United States